Tomotilus celebratus is a moth of the family Pterophoridae. It has been reported from Australia, India, Japan (including Honshu) and Indonesia (Java).  Until recently the species was known as Tomotilus saitoi, but the earlier name Oxyptilus celebratus has been recognised as an earlier reference to this same species.

The length of the forewings is 6–8 mm.

The larvae feed on Dunbaria villosa. They live in a tent-like structure formed by a folded ternate leaf of the host plant and eats the folded leaf from inside. Pupation usually occurs within this shelter. The pupal period lasts 4–6 days.

References

External links
Taxonomic And Biological Studies Of Pterophoridae Of Japan (Lepidoptera)
A Check-List Of Microlepidoptera Of India (Part-I: Family Pterophoridae)
Japanese Moths

Pterophoridae
Moths of Asia
Moths of Indonesia
Moths of Japan
Moths of Australia
Taxa named by Edward Meyrick